Don't Be S.A.F.E. (an acronym for Sensitive As Fuck Everyday) is the debut mixtape by American rapper Trinidad James. The mixtape was self-released on September 18, 2012, but was re-released exclusively to retailers on January 29, 2013 by Gold Gang Records and Def Jam Recordings. The mixtape features guest appearances by other indie artists including Reija Lee (of the electronic duo Kito & Reija Lee), ForteBowie, Juke and others. The retail version features a remix to "All Gold Everything", featuring T.I., Young Jeezy and 2 Chainz.

Track listing 

 Notes
 signifies a co-producer.
Any track that has the letter "S" is replaced with the dollar sign ($).
On the physical retail edition, "Females Welcomed" does not credit Reija Lee as the featured artist.
"Team Vacation" is stylized as "#TeamVacation".
"SouthSide" features additional vocals by ForteBowie.

Personnel 
Album credits were revealed on the physical retail version.

 Executive producer: Trinidad James
 Def Jam A&R: Karen Kwak
 A&R administration: Terese Joseph
 A&R coordination: Leesa D. Brunson
 Marketing: Christopher Atlas
 Mastering: Edgar Vargas
 Art producers: Tai Linzie
 Art direction and design: Tai Linzie
 Legal counsels for Def Jam: Damien Granderson and Colin Morrissey
 Management: Jordan Merz
 Package production: Carol Corless
 Vocal engineers: Jack "Suthernfolk" Brown and Tony Ray
 Mixing engineers: Justin Padron and Finis "KY" White
 Mastering assistant: Justin Padron
 Sample Clearance: Danny Zook & Corey "Siel" Lloyd

Charts

Release history

References

External links 

2013 mixtape albums
2013 EPs
Debut mixtape albums
Def Jam Recordings EPs
Trinidad James EPs
Trap music albums